The Moro is a river in Italy. It is located in the province of Chieti in the Abruzzo region of southern Italy. Its source is located near Guardiagrele. The river flows northeast past Orsogna and Lanciano before flowing into the Adriatic Sea near San Vito Chietino. The Allied Eighth Army fought the German 10th Army in the vicinity of the Moro in December 1943.

References

Rivers of the Province of Chieti
Rivers of Italy
Adriatic Italian coast basins